Arne Friedrich (born 29 May 1979) is a German football executive and former player who played as a defender. He formerly was the sporting director of Hertha BSC.

He played 82 times for the Germany national team.

Friedrich was a very versatile player, playing full-back, centre-back and occasionally a midfield position. He represented his country on 82 occasions, scoring once. He participated in Euro 2004, World Cup 2006, Euro 2008 and the World Cup 2010.

Club career

Arminia Bielefeld
In the 2000–01 season, Friedrich signed his first professional contract. Hermann Gerland, head coach of Arminia Bielefeld at the time, scouted Friedrich while playing for Regionalliga club SC Verl. Because of his convincing performance, Gerland decided to bring Friedrich to Bielefeld, where he immediately became a regular starter.

Hertha BSC

In 2002, Friedrich accepted an offer from Hertha BSC. With the Berlin club, he won the DFB-Ligapokal that year, defeating Bayern Munich, Borussia Dortmund and Schalke 04.

In 2004–05, Falko Götz named Friedrich captain, a role he kept for the remainder of his time at Hertha. He renewed his contract with Hertha twice which was due to run until 2012 with a performance-based option for an additional year. He made 231 matches in the German top-flight for the club from the capital.

VfL Wolfsburg
However, after Hertha's relegation in 2010, Friedrich left the club in a €2 million transfer to VfL Wolfsburg, signing a three-year contract.

On 19 September 2011, he was released from his contract at Wolfsburg due to long term injury.

Chicago Fire

In March 2012, Friedrich signed with the Chicago Fire of Major League Soccer. He made his competitive debut for the club in a match against the Houston Dynamo on 16 April 2012. The game ended in a 1–1 draw. Friedrich scored his first MLS goal on 12 August 2012 in a match against Philadelphia Union. Friedrich was named the club's 2012 season's Defender of the Year. At the end of 2012 season, he extended his contract with Chicago Fire until the end of 2013. 

As announced on 21 January 2013, Friedrich became a US permanent resident which allowed him to no longer occupy an international slot while playing for Major League Soccer clubs. Due to recurring injuries, Friedrich did not appear in any matches in 2013.

On 23 June 2013, Friedrich announced his retirement from professional football.

International career 

Friedrich played a total of five games for the Germany U-21 team and once for the B-team known as "Team 2006".

On 21 August 2002, he made his debut for the senior team against Bulgaria with in a 2–2 draw in Sofia. His first major tournament for the national team was Euro 2004 where he appeared in all three group matches that saw the German team was eliminated. On 21 December 2004, Friedrich captained Germany in a 5–1 friendly win over Thailand in Bangkok. He has captained the team three more time since.

In 2005, Germany took part in the Confederations Cup, as upcoming World Cup hosts. Friedrich took turns with Andreas Hinkel on the right wing-back position. The following year, he was part of the 23-man squad for the 2006 World Cup. Except the match for third place, which he missed due to an injury, Friedrich started all of Germany's games.

At Euro 2008, Friedrich was once again part of the German team, but was initially intended as a substitute. Following an injury to Marcell Jansen, he started the final group game and all three knock-out stage matches. The quarter-final was one of Friedrich's best international matches where he successfully shut down Portugal national team star Cristiano Ronaldo.

In March 2009, German coach Joachim Löw explained that he now planned Friedrich as a centre-back instead of the right wing-back position.

Friedrich was part of Germany's squad in the 2010 World Cup in South Africa. After a Bastian Schweinsteiger solo run, he scored his very first international goal on his 77th appearance for Germany on 3 July 2010 in the 2010 World Cup 4–0 quarter-final win over Argentina.

Career as manager and executive
On 28 August 2014, it was confirmed that Friedrich was the new assistant coach of the German U18 national team. He left the position at the end of 2015. 

On 27 November 2019, Friedrich was hired as a performance manager at Hertha BSC under manager Jürgen Klinsmann, who was hired earlier on the same day. After six months as performance manager, Friedrich took over as sporting director in summer 2020. Shortly after, in December, he was appointed interim managing director after manager Michael Preetz was let go. After a successful five months as interim managing director, Friedrich went back to his role of sporting director in July 2021 while simultaneously being appointed to the executive board of Hertha BSC.

Career statistics

Club

International 
Scores and results list Germany's goal tally first, score column indicates score after each Friedrich goal.

Honours 
Hertha BSC
 DFB-Ligapokal: 2002
 UEFA Intertoto Cup: 2006

Germany
FIFA World Cup third Place: 2006, 2010
UEFA European Championship runner-up: 2008
FIFA Confederations Cup third place: 2005

References

External links 

  
 
 
 

1979 births
Living people
People from Bad Oeynhausen
Sportspeople from Detmold (region)
German footballers
Footballers from North Rhine-Westphalia
Association football fullbacks
Germany international footballers
Germany B international footballers
Germany under-21 international footballers
UEFA Euro 2004 players
2005 FIFA Confederations Cup players
2006 FIFA World Cup players
UEFA Euro 2008 players
2010 FIFA World Cup players
Bundesliga players
2. Bundesliga players
Major League Soccer players
SC Verl players
Arminia Bielefeld players
Hertha BSC players
VfL Wolfsburg players
Chicago Fire FC players
German expatriate footballers
German expatriate sportspeople in the United States
Expatriate soccer players in the United States